Christopher Green (born 3 January 1990) is an English former professional rugby league footballer who last played as a  for the Leigh Centurions in the Betfred Championship. 

He played for Hull F.C. in the Super League and spent time on loan at from Hull at Doncaster in Championship 1 and the Championship, and the York City Knights and Featherstone Rovers in the Championship. Green has also spent time on loan from Hull at Wakefield in the 2019 Super League.

Background
Green was born in Kingston upon Hull, Humberside, England.

Career

Hull FC

He is well known by fans after his 79th minute try against local rivals Hull Kingston Rovers at the Magic Weekend in 2013, in which Hull F.C. went on to win the game 22–16.

He played in the 2016 Challenge Cup Final victory over the Warrington Wolves at Wembley Stadium.

He played in the 2017 Challenge Cup Final victory over the Wigan Warriors at Wembley Stadium.

Leigh Centurions
On 15 Oct 2021 it was reported that he had signed for Leigh Centurions in the RFL Championship

References

External links

Hull FC profile
SL profile
York City Knights announce new signings

1989 births
Living people
Doncaster R.L.F.C. players
English rugby league players
Featherstone Rovers players
Hull F.C. players
Leigh Leopards players
Rugby league locks
Rugby league players from Kingston upon Hull
Rugby league props
Wakefield Trinity players
York City Knights players